Kodjo Menan (31 December 1959) is a Togolese diplomat. Since 2009, he has been the permanent representative of Togo to the United Nations.

Menan was born in Vogan, Togo and was educated at the National Administration School of Lomé and the University of Benin in Lomé. He became Togo's permanent representative of the UN on 25 June 2009.

During February 2012, Menan was the President of the United Nations Security Council.

References
"His Excellency Kodjo Menan", The Washington Diplomat, 2011-04-03.
"New Permanent Representative of Togo Presents Credentials", UN Doc BIO/4092, 2009-06-25.

1959 births
Living people
Togolese diplomats
Permanent Representatives of Togo to the United Nations
University of Lomé alumni
People from Vogan
21st-century Togolese people